Hakim Syed Niamatullah (1900–1961) was an Indian politician and practitioner of Unani medicine who served as mayor of Madras city in 1943–44.

References 

 
 

1900 births
1961 deaths
Mayors of Chennai
Unani practitioners